WVVC-LD, virtual channel 40 (UHF digital channel 33), is a low-powered Antenna TV-affiliated television station licensed to Utica, New York, United States. The station is owned by Northeast Gospel Broadcasting, Inc.

History

WVVC was founded in 2004 by Northeast Gospel Broadcasting President Brian Larson and WVVC General Manager Mark Russ.  The purpose of the newly formed station was to offer a family friendly alternative for over-the-air viewers. In 2011, the station made the conversion to digital TV and began airing Retro TV at 40.1, Cornerstone at 40.2, and the Legacy TV Network at 40.3.

In 2017, WVVC-LD and its sister radio stations WVVC-FM in Dolgeville and WNGG-FM in Gloversville began branding themselves as "The Family Place", promoting the station group's commitment to family and faith focused programming. Three of the four digital subchannels WVVC provides are secular in nature.

Today WVVC-TV 40 is part of Northeast Gospel Broadcasting's Adirondack Praise Network along with WVVC 88.1 FM and WNGG 90.9 FM.     WVVC-TV is currently down with no estimated time of return.

Digital channels
The station's digital signal is multiplexed:

References

External links
WVVC official Web site
Query the FCC’s TV station database for WVVC
CDBS (RecNet) Information on WVVC-LD

VVC-LD
Antenna TV affiliates
Low-power television stations in the United States
1992 establishments in New York (state)
Television channels and stations established in 1992